Don't Stop 'Til We Major is the debut solo full-length album by American rapper and producer JT the Bigga Figga from San Francisco. It was released on September 10, 1992 through Lil Daddy Records, re-released three years later via Get Low Recordz with distribution by Priority Records, and reissued in 2000 via Get Low Records with distribution by ILG/Bayside Ent. Distribution and on July 20, 2006 via SMC Recordings with distribution by Fontana Distribution.

Track listing
"Intro"- 1:51
"The Bigga Figga"- 3:18
"Victim of the Vapes" featuring D-Moe - 4:15
"Appetizer"- 3:29
"The Hard Way"- 4:29
"Don't Stop 'til We Major"- 4:37
"The SFC" featuring RBL Posse, Gigolo G, San Quinn, Seff Tha Gaffla & D-Moe - 8:43
"9 to 5"- 4:04
"Mind Yo Own"- 4:13
"Nuthin' But a Hustla"- 5:14
"Get My Money"- 2:01
"Me and My Nigga"- 4:38
"Shouts Out"- 4:37
"Hidden Track"-0:50

References

External links

1991 debut albums
JT the Bigga Figga albums